Corredor is a district of the Corredores canton, in the Puntarenas province of Costa Rica.

History 
Corredor was created on 19 October 1973 by Ley 5373. Segregated from Golfito canton.

Geography 
Corredor has an area of  km² and an elevation of  metres.

Demographics 

For the 2011 census, Corredor had a population of  inhabitants.

Transportation

Road transportation 
The district is covered by the following road routes:
 National Route 2
 National Route 237
 National Route 238
 National Route 608
 National Route 614

References 

Districts of Puntarenas Province
Populated places in Puntarenas Province